Ivan MacMillan (born February 8, 1952) is a retired Canadian football player who played for the Ottawa Rough Riders, Toronto Argonauts, BC Lions and Saskatchewan Roughriders. He played junior football in Ottawa.

References

1952 births
Living people
BC Lions players